Vanessa Baudzus (born 15 January 1978) is a German footballer. She played in one match for the Germany women's national football team in 1998.

References

External links
 

1978 births
Living people
German women's footballers
Germany women's international footballers
Place of birth missing (living people)
Women's association footballers not categorized by position